Steve Eduardo Makuka Pereyra (born 26 November 1994) is an Uruguayan footballer who plays as a defender for Liga Nacional club Municipal.

References

External links
Profile at FOX Sports

1994 births
Living people
Uruguayan footballers
Uruguayan expatriate footballers
Club Atlético River Plate (Montevideo) players
Montevideo City Torque players
Huracán F.C. players
C.A. Progreso players
Liverpool F.C. (Montevideo) players
Atlético Bucaramanga footballers
Uruguayan Primera División players
Uruguayan Segunda División players
Categoría Primera A players
Association football defenders
Uruguayan expatriate sportspeople in Colombia
Expatriate footballers in Colombia